Marinheiro is a Portuguese surname derived from the word "sailor". Notable people with the surname include:
Fábio Marinheiro
Paulo Sérgio Soares Marinheiro
Pedro Vaz Marinheiro

See also

Portuguese-language surnames